This is a list of singles that have peaked in the top 10 of the Billboard Hot 100 during 1990.

Janet Jackson scored five top ten hits during the year with "Rhythm Nation", "Escapade", "Alright", "Come Back to Me", and "Black Cat", the most among all other artists.

Top-ten singles

1989 peaks

1991 peaks

See also
 1990 in music
 List of Hot 100 number-one singles of 1990 (U.S.)
 Billboard Year-End Hot 100 singles of 1990

References

General sources

Joel Whitburn Presents the Billboard Hot 100 Charts: The Eighties
Joel Whitburn Presents the Billboard Hot 100 Charts: The Nineties
Additional information obtained can be verified within Billboard's online archive services and print editions of the magazine.

1990
United States Hot 100 Top 10